Bangholme is a suburb in Melbourne, Victoria, Australia,  south-east of Melbourne's Central Business District, located within the City of Greater Dandenong local government area.

Located adjacent to the urban area, the area is semi-rural and is part of Melbourne's South East Green Wedge, with a significant part of the land used by the Melbourne Water Eastern Sewage Treatment Plant, and the remainder being mostly small land holdings, with some used for horse acreage.

The EastLink tollway passes through the area.

Willow Lodge Village, a mobile home development, is located on Frankston-Dandenong Road.

History

Bangholme Post Office opened on 15 June 1925, and closed in 1943.

Demographics

Bangholme has a SEIFA score of 744, indicating a high level of disadvantage — it is in the bottom percentile nationally and has the lowest score of any Melbourne suburb.

Sport

The National Water Sports Centre is located in Bangholme adjacent to the Patterson River. Originally the watersports centre was created for the 1996 Melbourne Olympics, which was lost to Atlanta. Since then the Watersports centre has had no major updates besides the water park that operates on the same land. 

Golfers play at the course of the Eastern Sward Golf Club on Thompson Road, Bangholme.

Horse riding lessons are conducted at BlinkBonnie Equestrian Centre on Pillars Road.

Horse agistment (paddocks for hire) is also available at various properties on and near Pillars Road.

See also
 City of Springvale – Bangholme was previously within this former local government area.

References

External links
Australian Places - Bangholme

Suburbs of the City of Greater Dandenong